Pick Up the Pieces is the debut album from Jamaican roots reggae group The Royals, collecting recordings made between 1973 and 1977, and produced by Royals lead vocalist and only constant member Roy Cousins. Musicians on the album include members of The Wailers, Soul Syndicate, The In Crowd, and the Now Generation Band. The album was later licensed to United Artists subsidiary Ballistic Records, and was reissued in an expanded form in 2002 by Pressure Sounds. The songs on the album have been described as "some of the most musically sublime expressions of Rastafarian faith and the hardships of ghetto living Jamaica has produced".

Track listing

Original Magnum (1977) and Ballistic (1978) releases
"Pick Up The Pieces"
"Ghetto Man"
"Jah Jah Knows"
"Sufferer Of The Ghetto"
"If I Were You"
"When You Are Wrong"
"Promised Land"
"Only For A Time"
"Blacker Black"
"Peace And Love"

1980s Tamoki Wambesi release
"Pick Up The Pieces"
"Ghetto Man"
"Jah Jah Knows"
"Sufferer Of The Ghetto"
"If I Were You"
"If You Want Good"
"When You Are Wrong"
"Promised Land"
"Only For A Time"
"Blacker Black"
"Peace And Love"
"Facts Of Life"

2002 Pressure Sounds CD release
"Pick Up The Pieces"
"Ghetto Man"
"Heart In Pain"
"Only Jah Knows"
"Sufferer Of The Ghetto"
"If I Were You"
"When You Are Wrong (Version 1)"
"When You Are Wrong (Version 2)"
"Promised Land"
"Message"
"Only For A Time"
"Genuine Way"
"Blacker Black"
"Peace And Love"
"Facts Of Life"
"If You Want Good"
"Make Believe (Version 1)"
"Make Believe (Version 2)"
"Leave Out Of Babylon"
"Down Comes The Rain"

Personnel
Engineer: Sid Bucknor, King Tubby, Errol Thompson, Ernest Hoo Kim, Dennis Thompson, Karl Pitterson, Carlton Lee
Vocals: Roy Cousins, Errol Wilson, Keith Smith, Berthram Johnson
Drums: Anthony "Ben Bow" Creary, Phil Callendar, Carlton "Santa" Davis, Leroy "Horsemouth" Wallace
Bass: Earl "Bagga" Walker, Robbie Shakespeare, Bertram Johnson, Aston Barrett, George "Fully" Fullwood
Guitar: Geoffrey Chung, Noel "Sewell" Bailey, Lynford "Hux" Brown, Ernest Ranglin, Ranchie McLean, Albert Griffiths, Gits, Earl "Chinna" Smith
Piano: Robert Lynn, Lloyd Charmers, Pablove Black, Bobby Kalphat, Gladstone Anderson, Bernard "Touter" Harvey
Organ: Ossie Hibbert, Ansel Collins, Earl "Wire" Lindo, Winston Wright
Horns: Vin Gordon, Tommy McCook, Bobby Ellis, Richard "Dirty Harry" Hall, Herman Marquis

References

External links
Pressure Sounds page on the 2002 reissue
Review from Reggae-reviews.com

1977 debut albums
The Royals (band) albums